The 1992 season was the first season in the top Ukrainian football league for Shakhtar Donetsk. Shakhtar Donetsk competed in Vyshcha Liha and Ukrainian Cup, earlier Shakhtar was eliminated from the 1991–92 Soviet Cup.

Players

Squad information

 Serhiy Scherbakov is a Russian footballer who played couple of friendlies for Ukraine in 1992.
 In bold are players who also played for the Ukraine national football team in 1992 (4 players).

Transfers

In

Out

Competitions

Overall

Premier League

League table

Results summary

Results by round

Matches

Notes:
 At the Round 8 match goal on 64' was scored by Rebrov, but some sources have it to be scored by Schebakov. The website (www.uafootball.net.ua) that provides game report does not list Rebrov to score 3 goals for that game on 8 April in the list of hat-tricks (Hat-tricks).

Ukrainian Cup

Soviet Cup

References

External links
 Склад Шахтар Донецьк у сезоні 1992. www.allplayers.in.ua
 "Шахтар" Донецьк - 1992. www.uafootball.net.ua
 Состав команды «Шахтёр» Донецк в сезоне 1992. footballfacts.ru

Shakhtar Donetsk
FC Shakhtar Donetsk seasons